Carlstad United BK was a Swedish football club located in Karlstad. The club, formed in 1998, last played in the third highest Swedish league, Division 1 Norra. The club was affiliated to the Värmlands Fotbollförbund.  They merged with Karlstad BK after the 2019 season to form IF Karlstad Fotboll.

Season to season

Attendances

In recent seasons Carlstad United BK  have had the following average attendances:

Notable former players
Joel Rajalakso

Managers
 Björn-Magne Broen (2000–01)
 Börje Andersson (2002–06)
 Per-Johan Karlsson (2007–08)
 Lennart Andersson (2008)
 Milenko Vukcevic (2008–09)
 Håkan Werme & Roger Werner (2010)
 Lars-Olof Andersson (2010)
 Dave Mosson (2011–2013)
 Jonas Rehnberg (2014–2015)
 Amir Alagić (2016)
 David Ekelund (2016–)

External links

 Official site

Footnotes

Defunct football clubs in Sweden
Sport in Karlstad
Sport in Värmland County
Association football clubs established in 1998
1998 establishments in Sweden
Association football clubs disestablished in 2019